Xyris andina is a species of plant in the Xyridaceae family. It is endemic to Ecuador.  Its natural habitat is subtropical or tropical moist montane forests, and much of its range now under threat of habitat destruction.

References

andina
Flora of Ecuador
Critically endangered plants
Plants described in 1913
Taxonomy articles created by Polbot
Taxa named by Gustaf Oskar Andersson Malme